The Jungles of Chult (product code FRM1) is an accessory for the Dungeons & Dragons campaign setting Forgotten Realms released in 1993.

Contents
The Jungles of Chult  describes the Chultan Peninsula of Faerûn.  The location is known for having dinosaurs and undead.

This is a 64-page booklet that includes a fold-out color poster map of the region.

Publication history
The book was written by James Lowder and Jean Rabe. Cover art is by Robh Ruppel, with interior illustrations by Terry Dykstra, and cartography by Steve Beck.

Reception

References

Forgotten Realms sourcebooks
Role-playing game supplements introduced in 1993